Clypidina notata, common name the black-ribbed false limpet, is a species of sea snail, a marine gastropod mollusk in the family Fissurellidae, the keyhole limpets.

Description
The size of the shell reaches 18 mm.

Distribution
This species occurs in the Indian Ocean.

References

External links
 

Fissurellidae
Molluscs described in 1758
Taxa named by Carl Linnaeus